Luciano Gariboldi (18 August 1927 – 18 February 1988) was an Italian professional football player.

References

1927 births
1988 deaths
Italian footballers
Serie A players
Inter Milan players
Atalanta B.C. players
Hellas Verona F.C. players
Aurora Pro Patria 1919 players
S.S.C. Bari players
A.C. Reggiana 1919 players
Association football defenders